Q.E.D. or QED is an initialism of the Latin phrase , meaning "which was to be demonstrated". Literally it states "what was to be shown". Traditionally, the abbreviation is placed at the end of mathematical proofs and philosophical arguments in print publications, to indicate that the proof or the argument is complete.

Etymology and early use 
The phrase quod erat demonstrandum is a translation into Latin from the Greek  (abbreviated as ΟΕΔ). Translating from the Latin phrase into English yields "what was to be demonstrated". However, translating the Greek phrase  can produce a slightly different meaning. In particular, since the verb  also means to show or to prove, a different translation from the Greek phrase would read "The very thing it was required to have shown."

The Greek phrase was used by many early Greek mathematicians, including Euclid and Archimedes.

The Latin phrase is attested in a 1501 Euclid translation of Giorgio Valla. Its abbreviation q.e.d. is used once in 1598 by Johannes Praetorius, more in 1643 by Anton Deusing, extensively in 1655 by Isaac Barrow in the form Q.E.D., and subsequently by many post-Renaissance mathematicians and philosophers.

Modern philosophy 

During the European Renaissance, scholars often wrote in Latin, and phrases such as Q.E.D. were often used to conclude proofs.

Perhaps the most famous use of Q.E.D. in a philosophical argument is found in the Ethics of Baruch Spinoza, published posthumously in 1677. Written in Latin, it is considered by many to be Spinoza's magnum opus. The style and system of the book are, as Spinoza says, "demonstrated in geometrical order", with axioms and definitions followed by propositions. For Spinoza, this is a considerable improvement over René Descartes's writing style in the Meditations, which follows the form of a diary.

Difference from Q.E.F. 
There is another Latin phrase with a slightly different meaning, usually shortened similarly, but being less common in use. , originating from the Greek geometers' closing , meaning "which had to be done". Because of the difference in meaning, the two phrases should not be confused.

Euclid used the Greek original of Quod Erat Faciendum (Q.E.F.) to close propositions that were not proofs of theorems, but constructions of geometric objects. For example, Euclid's first proposition showing how to construct an equilateral triangle, given one side, is concluded this way.

English equivalent 
There is no common formal English equivalent, although the end of a proof may be announced with a simple statement such as "this completes the proof", "as required", "as desired", "as expected", "hence proved", "ergo", "so correct", or other similar locutions.

Typographical forms used symbolically 

Due to the paramount importance of proofs in mathematics, mathematicians since the time of Euclid have developed conventions to demarcate the beginning and end of proofs. In printed English language texts, the formal statements of theorems, lemmas, and propositions are set in italics by tradition. The beginning of a proof usually follows immediately thereafter, and is indicated by the word "proof" in boldface or italics. On the other hand, several symbolic conventions exist to indicate the end of a proof.

While some authors still use the classical abbreviation, Q.E.D., it is relatively uncommon in modern mathematical texts. Paul Halmos claims to have pioneered the use of a solid black square (or rectangle) at the end of a proof as a Q.E.D. symbol, a practice which has become standard, although not universal. Halmos noted that he adopted this use of a symbol from magazine typography customs in which simple geometric shapes had been used to indicate the end of an article, so-called end marks. This symbol was later called the tombstone, the Halmos symbol, or even a halmos by mathematicians. Often the Halmos symbol is drawn on chalkboard to signal the end of a proof during a lecture, although this practice is not so common as its use in printed text.

In the AMS Theorem Environment for LaTeX, the hollow square is the default end-of-proof symbol. Unicode explicitly provides the "end of proof" character, U+220E (∎). Some authors use other Unicode symbols to note the end of a proof, including, ▮ (U+25AE, a black vertical rectangle), and ‣ (U+2023, a triangular bullet). Other authors have adopted two forward slashes (//) or four forward slashes (////). In other cases, authors have elected to segregate proofs typographically—by displaying them as indented blocks.

Modern humorous use 
In Joseph Heller's 1961 book Catch-22, the Chaplain, having been told to examine a forged letter allegedly signed by him (which he knew he didn't sign), verified that his name was in fact there. His investigator replied, "Then you wrote it. Q.E.D." The chaplain said he did not write it and that it was not his handwriting, to which the investigator replied, "Then you signed your name in somebody else's handwriting again."

In the 1978 science-fiction radio comedy, and later in the television, novel, and film adaptations of The Hitchhiker's Guide to the Galaxy, "Q.E.D." is referred to in the Guide's entry for the babel fish, when it is claimed that the babel fish – which serves the "mind-bogglingly" useful purpose of being able to translate any spoken language when inserted into a person's ear – is used as evidence for existence and non-existence of God. The exchange from the novel is as follows: "'I refuse to prove I exist,' says God, 'for proof denies faith, and without faith I am nothing.' 'But,' says Man, 'The babel fish is a dead giveaway, isn't it? It could not have evolved by chance. It proves you exist, and so therefore, by your own arguments, you don't. QED.' 'Oh dear,' says God, 'I hadn't thought of that,' and promptly vanishes in a puff of logic."

In Neal Stephenson's 1999 novel Cryptonomicon, Q.E.D. is used as a punchline to several humorous anecdotes, in which characters go to great lengths to prove something non-mathematical.

Singer-songwriter Thomas Dolby's 1988 song "Airhead" includes the lyric, "Quod erat demonstrandum, baby," referring to the self-evident vacuousness of the eponymous subject; and in response, a female voice delightedly squeals, "Oooh... you speak French!"

See also 
 List of Latin abbreviations
 A priori and a posteriori
 Bob's your uncle
 Ipso facto
 Q.E.A.

References

External links

Earliest Known Uses of Some of the Words of Mathematics (Q)

Latin logical phrases
Latin philosophical phrases
Mathematical proofs
Mathematical terminology